The Bedroom Sessions or Bedroom Sessions may refer to:

Albums 
 The Bedroom Sessions (Faithless album)
 The Bedroom Sessions (Bring Me the Horizon album)

See also 
 The Early Bedroom Sessions, an album by Basshunter
 Loveworm (Bedroom Sessions), an album by Beabadoobee
 Some Lessons: The Bedroom Sessions, an EP by Melody Gardot